Anirut Naiyana (born 11 April 1996) is a Thai professional footballer who plays as a goalkeeper for Thai League 2 club Uthai Thani.

External links

1996 births
Living people
Anirut Naiyana
Association football goalkeepers
Anirut Naiyana
Anirut Naiyana
Anirut Naiyana